Buckingham House was a residence of the Dukes of Buckingham and Chandos in Pall Mall, London. Designed by the Neoclassical architect Sir John Soane in 1790, it featured the Neo-Palladian style for the three-storey-high frontage. The construction work finished in 1795.

The house was demolished in 1908, and the Royal Automobile Club occupies the site today.

Bibliography

References

Historic buildings and structures in England
John Soane buildings
Buildings and structures completed in 1795
History of the City of Westminster
Houses completed in the 18th century
Former houses in the City of Westminster
Buildings and structures demolished in 1908
Palladian architecture in England
Demolished buildings and structures in London